Weerawila Airport   is a domestic military and civilian airport located in Weerawila, in the Hambantota District of Sri Lanka.

International Airport project 

The airport was one of the key sites identified for the development of an international airport,  and was to be renamed to Weerawila Airport. The project was later scrapped and finally moved to Mattala, inaugurating under the Mattala Rajapaksa International Airport title in early 2013.

References 

Airports in Sri Lanka